The Blue Hen Stakes at Delaware Park Racetrack is an American Thoroughbred horse race  for two-year-old fillies held annually in early October at Delaware Park Racetrack in Stanton, Delaware.  A non-graded stakes event raced on dirt, since 2004 it has been contested at a distance of one and one-sixteenth miles (8.5 furlongs).

The Blue Hen is named for the horse breeding term "Blue Hen,"  meaning a mare who has proved herself exceptional in producing high quality foals, almost regardless of which stallion might be the sire.  These sons and daughters would also affect the breed. An example of the highest sort of Blue Hen mare would be La Troienne.

In 1965 and 1971, the race was run in two divisions.

Winners since 2000

Earlier winners
(partial list)

1999 - Fiesty Countess
1998 - Godmother
1997 - Expensive Issue
1996 - The Lady's Unreal
1977 - Mesa Warrant
1976 - Nearna
1972 - Tuerta
1971 - Misty Bryn
1971 - Hasty Jude
1970 - Unity Hall
1969 - Gay Meeting
1968 - Parisian Parfait
1967 - Obeah
1966 - Regal Gleam
1965 - Ogirema
1965 - Turn To Talent
1964 - Come Hither Look
1963 - Katie Kitten
1962 - Nalee
1961 - Cicada
1960 - Baby Kiki
1959 - Blonde Demond
1958 - Nora Dares

References

 The 2009 Blue Hen Stakes at Delaware Park

Ungraded stakes races in the United States
Flat horse races for two-year-old fillies
Delaware Park Racetrack